A tahini roll or tahini bread roll is a sweet pastry found commonly in the cuisines of Arab countries, Armenia, Cyprus, Greece and Turkey. 

They are a popular street food in Cyprus. In the Cypriot capital of Nicosia, street vendors with carts or bikes, as well as bakeries sell tahini rolls.

Its name varies by location. In Arab countries it is known as khubz tahini.

The dough includes sugar and oil and has a texture between a bread and a cookie. It is leavened with yeast and can be baked after the first rise. Sometimes the pastry may be soaked in syrup of sugar or honey, and flavored with cinnamon.

Tahini rolls are made by rolling the dough flat, spreading it with the tahini mixture, sprinkling with sugar, and rolling into a log shape. The dough is then sliced into smaller pieces and flattened to form a circle.

According to Palestinian chef Sami Tamimi, the pastry originates in Armenia.

See also 
List of bread rolls
 Tahinopita
 Sweet roll
Fig roll

References 

Greek pastries
Sweet breads
Armenian cuisine
Azerbaijani cuisine
Balkan cuisine
Bosnia and Herzegovina cuisine
Cypriot cuisine
Egyptian cuisine
Turkish pastries
Lebanese cuisine
Middle Eastern cuisine
Syrian cuisine
Turkish Cypriot cuisine
Arab cuisine
Palestinian cuisine